The Nordic Opening is a cross-country skiing event held annually since the 2010–11 season in Ruka, Finland or Lillehammer, Norway. The Nordic Opening is a Stage World Cup event in the FIS Cross-Country World Cup, and are held as the first or second World Cup race weekend of the season. The inaugural Nordic Opening was held in 2010 and was originally named Ruka Triple. The editions of the mini-tour hosted in Lillehammer is also known as Lillehammer Triple. Each Nordic Opening consists of three stages; a sprint, an individual race and a pursuit. As of 2019, the prize money for the event amount to 240,000 Swiss francs, shared out on both men and women. Men's and women's events are held together on the same days, with the only difference being the distance skied.

The first stages was arranged on 26 November 2010 and were won by Marit Bjørgen (ladies) and John Kristian Dahl (men). Marit Bjørgen and Alexander Legkov of Russia won the first overall Nordic Opening.

Venues

Race structure

Ranking

The overall results are based on the aggregate time for all events, as well as bonus seconds awarded on the sprint stage, which are subtracted from the athlete's overall time. As of 2019, bonus seconds are awarded to the 30 skiers that qualify for the quarter-finals.

The final stage of the race is held in a pursuit format, with competitors starting with the gaps they have in the overall classification, so the first skier to reach the finish line is the overall winner.

Prizes
Prizes and bonuses are awarded for daily placings and final placings at the end of the race. In 2019, the winners received CHF 22,500, while each of the stage winners won CHF 5,000.

Stages

Stage 1: Sprint
The first stage in the Nordic Opening is a sprint. A sprint consists of two rounds; a qualification round and a final round with a knock-out competition format. The 30 fastest skiers in the qualification round qualify for the final round quarter-finals. In the quarter-, and semi-finals, the skiers compete in heats of six and the two best skiers in each heat are guaranteed progression, while the two fastest non-guaranteed progression times move on as "lucky losers". 12 skiers advance from the quarter-finals to the semi-finals of which six advance to the final. The winners are rewarded, as of 2019, 30 bonus seconds. The bonus seconds awarded on the sprint stage are meant to encourage sprinter specialists to go for results in the overall standings.

Stage 2: Interval start
The second stage in the Nordic Opening is an interval start, or time trial stage. Skiers are sent out from the start in 30 second intervals. The interval start stage was 5 km for women and 10 km for men from the first event in 2010, but has since 2017 been a race over 10 km for women and 15 km for men.

Stage 3: Pursuit
The third and ultimate stage of the mini-tour is a pursuit with starting intervals equal to the skiers accumulative times in the overall standings; which means that the first skier to cross the finish line is the winner of the Nordic Opening. The stage's length have in every edition been 10 km for women and 15 km for men. If the overall time differences are big before the last stage, the race jury can decide that the lowest ranked skiers start in a wave start.

Overall winners

Men

Women

Records and statistics

Overall winners
Four skiers have won the Nordic Opening two or more times. Marit Bjørgen (NOR) is the only skier to win five times. Martin Johnsrud Sundby (NOR) has won the Nordic Opening four times.

Overall winners without stage wins
The following skiers have won the Nordic Opening without winning any of the three stages: Alexander Legkov (2010), Petter Northug (2012), Marit Bjørgen (2013), Martin Johnsrud Sundby (2016), Charlotte Kalla (2017) and Didrik Tønseth (2018).

Stage wins

4 men and 4 women have won two or more stages in the Nordic Opening. Therese Johaug has won the most stages with 10, followed by Marit Bjørgen's 9 stage wins. Bjørgen (2012) is the only skier to win all three stages in one Nordic Opening. Johannes Høsflot Klæbo and Martin Johnsrud Sundby have won three stages each, most among the men.

Skiers who are still active are indicated in bold. Skiers with the same number of stage wins are listed alphabetically.

World Cup points
The overall winner are awarded 200 points. The winners of each of the three stages are awarded 50 points. The maximum number of points an athlete can earn is therefore 350 points.

References

Sources
 
 

 
FIS Cross-Country World Cup
Cross-country skiing competitions in Finland
Cross-country skiing competitions in Norway
Sport in Lillehammer
November sporting events
2010 establishments in Europe
Recurring sporting events established in 2010
International sports competitions hosted by Finland
International sports competitions hosted by Norway